Zeta Telescopii (ζ Telescopii) is the second-brightest star in the southern constellation of Telescopium. It is a solitary, orange-hued star that is visible to the naked eye with an apparent visual magnitude of +4.13. Based upon an annual parallax shift of 25.84 mas as seen from Earth, it is located around 127 light years from the Sun.

This is a red clump giant star of spectral type K1 III-IV. At its estimated distance, this yields a physical size of about 9 times the radius of the Sun. It is around 1.53 times as massive as the Sun and it shines at an effective temperature of 4,801 K.

References

K-type giants
Horizontal-branch stars
Telescopii, Zeta
Telescopium (constellation)
Durchmusterung objects
169767
090568
6905